The Indian Ocean Tuna Commission (IOTC) is an intergovernmental organization that co-ordinates the regulation and management of tuna in the Indian Ocean. Conceived in 1993, it entered into existence in 1996.

A multilateral treaty, the Agreement for the Establishment of the Indian Ocean Tuna Commission was approved by the Council of the Food and Agriculture Organization of the United Nations in November 1993. The agreement entered into force on 27 March 1996 after it had been accepted by a tenth party. The Agreement is open to any state that has coasts within the Indian Ocean region (or adjacent seas) as well as any state that fishes for tuna in the Indian Ocean region. The agreement is also open to regional economic organizations.

The IOTC is the successor to the Indo-Pacific Tuna Development and Management Programme, which was established in 1982.

As of July 2016, there are 31 members of IOTC:

Vanuatu was a member of the IOTC between 2012 and 2015. It chose to withdraw from the organization.

IOTC headquarters are located in Victoria, Seychelles.

See also
Inter-American Tropical Tuna Commission

External links
iotc.org, official website
Agreement for the Establishment of the Indian Ocean Tuna Commission
Agreement status.

Intergovernmental organizations established by treaty
Tuna
Organizations established in 1996
Organisations based in Seychelles
Victoria, Seychelles
Indian Ocean
Fisheries agencies